Mitrella condei is a species of sea snail, a marine gastropod mollusk in the family Columbellidae, the dove snails.

Description
The length of the shell attains 16.5 mm.

Distribution
This marine species occurs off Angola..

References

 Rolán E. 2005. Columbellidae (Gastropoda, Neogastropoda) of the gulf of Guinea with the description of eight new species. Iberus 23(2): 119-156 
 Bouchet, P.; Fontaine, B. (2009). List of new marine species described between 2002-2006. Census of Marine Life

condei
Gastropods described in 2005